The Dallison was an English cyclecar made in 1913 only by the Dallison Gearing and Motor Co Ltd based in Birmingham.

The car was powered by a Precision air- or water-cooled, V twin engine driving the rear wheels by, unusually, a five-speed gearbox and worm gear final drive.

It was planned to make 30 cars a week but it is unlikely that this actually happened.

See also
 List of car manufacturers of the United Kingdom

References 

Cyclecars
Defunct motor vehicle manufacturers of England
Vehicles introduced in 1913
1913 in England
Defunct companies based in Birmingham, West Midlands